Pytlakowski is a Polish surname. Notable people with the surname include:

 Andrzej Pytlakowski (1919–2010), Polish chess master
 Piotr Pytlakowski (born 1951), Polish journalist and screenwriter

Polish-language surnames